Bosbach may refer to:

People
 Franz Bosbach (born 1952), German historian 
 Wolfgang Bosbach (born 1952), German politician

Places
 Bösbach, river in Bavaria, Germany